Ross Clark (born 7 February 1983) is a Scottish footballer who played 'senior' for Queen's Park, Alloa Athletic, Dumbarton and Stenhousemuir.

Honours
Dumbarton

Scottish Division Three (fourth tier): Winners 2008–09

References

1983 births
Scottish footballers
Association football midfielders
Dumbarton F.C. players
Alloa Athletic F.C. players
Queen's Park F.C. players
Stenhousemuir F.C. players
Scottish Football League players
Sportspeople from Rutherglen
Living people
Footballers from South Lanarkshire